Anhammus is a genus of longhorn beetles of the subfamily Lamiinae, containing the following species:

 Anhammus aberrans Ritsema, 1881
 Anhammus dalenii (Guérin-Ménéville, 1844)
 Anhammus luzonicus Breuning, 1982

References

Lamiini